Admiral Henry Ariosto Wiley (31 January 1867 – 20 May 1943) was an officer in the United States Navy during the Spanish–American War, World War I, and World War II.

Biography
Born in Pike County, Alabama, Wiley graduated from the United States Naval Academy in 1888. He served on the Maple during the Spanish–American War and attained his first command, Villalobos, in 1904. During the First World War Wiley commanded battleship  attached to the 6th Battle Squadron of the British Grand Fleet and received the Distinguished Service Medal for his "outstanding performance."

After various shore and fleet commands, he was appointed Admiral in 1927 and served as Commander-in-chief, United States Fleet, until his retirement in 1929 after over 40 years of service.

Wiley wrote his memoirs in 1934.

Wiley served in the years that followed as Chairman of the Maritime Commission and in other important government posts until being recalled to active duty in 1941. In the next year, he headed the Navy Board of Production Awards.

Wiley retired once more 2 January 1943 and died 20 May 1943 at Palm Beach, Florida. He was buried in Arlington National Cemetery four days later.

Namesake
USS Henry A. Wiley was named for him.

Wiley Hall, the main Administration Building at the United States Merchant Marine Academy is named for Admiral Wiley as the "Father of the Merchant Marine Cadet Corps".

References

1867 births
1943 deaths
People from Pike County, Alabama
United States Naval Academy alumni
Naval War College alumni
American military personnel of the Spanish–American War
United States Navy personnel of World War I
United States Navy admirals
United States Navy World War II admirals
Recipients of the Navy Distinguished Service Medal
Burials at Arlington National Cemetery